Reduction of hours of work may refer to:

 Eight-hour day, the product of a social movement to regulate the length of a working day
 Four-day week, a policy to reduce the working week to four days rather than the more customary five
 Working time § Gradual decrease in working hours
 Work–life balance

See also 
 Reduction of Hours of Work Convention (disambiguation)